Emmanuel Giovani Hernández Neri (born 4 January 1993) is a Mexican professional footballer who plays as an attacking midfielder.

Club career
Giovanni Hernandez started his career with C.D. Guadalajara. He scored a spectacular freekick against Querétaro in a 1–4 defeat on 21 September 2014.

Loan at Sinaloa
During the 2015 Liga MX Draft he was sent out on a six-month loan deal to Dorados de Sinaloa with no purchase option.

Honours
Mexico U20
CONCACAF U-20 Championship: 2013

References

External links

1993 births
Living people
Mexican footballers
Mexican expatriate footballers
Footballers from Guadalajara, Jalisco
Mexico under-20 international footballers
Liga MX players
C.D. Guadalajara footballers
Dorados de Sinaloa footballers
C.D. Veracruz footballers
Club Necaxa footballers
Club Atlético Zacatepec players
Antigua GFC players
Association football midfielders
Mexican expatriate sportspeople in Guatemala
Expatriate footballers in Guatemala